"Blue huckleberry" refers to either of two plants native to North America:

 Gaylussacia frondosa, Eastern United States - a dangleberry
 Vaccinium deliciosum (also called Cascade bilberry or Cascade huckleberry), Western United States and British Columbia, Canada - a bilberry